Glen Art   is a Scottish charity helping those from a military background return to civilian life. Their projects and artistic events aim to bring people together and strengthen relationships between ex-service personnel and their communities.  Their facility at Erskine provides both dogs and training for veterans and their families.

Glen Art's canine wing Bravehound, was voted the UK's best Voluntary/Charity project in the National Lottery Awards 2017.

History
Glen Art was established in 2013 by Arisaig opera singer Fiona MacDonald. The charities’ objective is to encourage artists and musicians to use their talents in the service of those who have served in the armed forces. MacDonald founded the charity in honour of Mary McKinnon, an Arisaig nurse from Queen Alexandra's Royal Army Nursing Corps, serving on HMHS Glenart Castle 1918.

Mission
Glen Art support ex-service personnel and involve veterans at every stage of each project and work to support them in whatever way they need. They organise artistic and horticultural activities as well as their Bravehound programme, providing training and dogs with the aim to promote healthy exercise, socialising and teamwork.

Glen Art is funded by the Chancellor using Libor funds.

Activities
Events have included Theatre of War in 2015 and 2018, A Poem To Remember launched by Prince William in 2018, a memorial garden in conjunction with the Commonwealth War Graves Commission and the Wilfred Owen Association 2017, a 2016 memorial concert celebrating the life of Sir Nicholas Winton in support of Syrian refugees with the Royal Birmingham Conservatoire and a Night To Remember (2014-2016) featuring Dr Bill Frankland supporting the Parachute Regiment.

Glen Art is a member of the Confederation of Service Charities and regulated by the OSCR (Scottish Charity Regulator).

See also 
Combat Stress
Erskine
Help for Heroes
Hounds for Heroes
Not Forgotten Association
The Royal British Legion
Walking With The Wounded

References

External links
Official website

Non-profit organisations based in Scotland
Assistance dogs
British veterans' organisations